Leonese Autonomist Party–Leonesist Unity (PAL–UL) is a Leonese regionalist political party founded in 2005 by ex-members of the Leonese People's Union (UPL), led by José María Rodríguez de Francisco.

The party won 10 local seats in the 2011 local elections and 7 in the 2015 ones.

References

Political parties in Castile and León
Political parties in the Province of León
Regionalist parties in Spain
Political parties established in 2005
2005 establishments in Spain